Teri E. Klein is an American professor of Biomedical Data Science and Medicine (and of Genetics, by courtesy) at Stanford University. She is known for her work on  pharmacogenomics and computational biology.

Education
Klein has a B.A. from the University of California, Santa Cruz (1980) and a Ph.D. from the University of California, San Francisco (1987). In 2000 she started a position at Stanford University where, as of 2022 she holds the position of professor (research).

She is a co-founder of the Pacific Symposium on Biocomputing and is a Principal Investigator for PharmGKB, Clinical Pharmacogenomics Implementation Consortium (CPIC), The Pharmacogenomic Clinical Annotation Tool (PharmCAT), and Clinical Genome Resource (ClinGen).

Selected publications

Awards and honors
Klein was named a fellow of the American College of Medical Informatics in 2001. In 2021, she was named a fellow of the American Association for the Advancement of Science.

References

External links 
 
 Helix Group website at Stanford University

Living people
Fellows of the American Association for the Advancement of Science
Stanford University faculty
University of California, San Francisco alumni
University of California, Santa Cruz alumni
American pharmacologists
Women medical researchers
Year of birth missing (living people)